Estakhruyeh (also Romanized as Estakhrūyeh; also known as Eşţabl Qū, Estalkhū, and Eşţal Qū) is a village in Banestan Rural District, in the Central District of Behabad County, Yazd Province, Iran. At the 2006 census, its population was 19, in 9 families.

References 

Populated places in Behabad County